Tre'Vour Wallace-Simms (born September 25, 1997) is an American football guard who is a free agent. After playing college football at Missouri, he signed with the Jacksonville Jaguars as an undrafted free agent in 2020.

Professional career

Jacksonville Jaguars
Wallace-Simms signed with the Jacksonville Jaguars as an undrafted free agent following the 2020 NFL Draft on April 27, 2020. He was placed on the reserve/COVID-19 list by the team on July 27, 2020, and activated on August 20. He was waived during final roster cuts on September 5, 2020, and signed to the team's practice squad two days later. He was elevated to the active roster on December 12, December 19, December 26, 2020, and January 2, 2021, for the team's weeks 14, 15, 16, and 17 games against the Tennessee Titans, Baltimore Ravens, Chicago Bears, and Indianapolis Colts, and reverted to the practice squad after each game. He signed a reserve/futures contract with the team on January 4, 2021.

On August 31, 2021, Wallace-Simms was waived by the Jaguars and re-signed to the practice squad the next day.

Houston Texans
On June 6, 2022, Wallace-Simms signed with the Houston Texans. He was waived on August 30, 2022. He was re-signed to the practice squad on September 21.

References

External links
Jacksonville Jaguars bio
Missouri Tigers football bio

1997 births
Living people
Sportspeople from East St. Louis, Illinois
Players of American football from Illinois
American football offensive guards
Missouri Tigers football players
Jacksonville Jaguars players
Houston Texans players